Natalie Mitsue Nakase (born April 18, 1980) is an American professional basketball coach and former player who is an assistant coach with the Las Vegas Aces of the Women's National Basketball Association (WNBA). After retiring as a player, she was a head coach for both men's and women's professional teams. She was later an assistant coach for the Los Angeles Clippers in the National Basketball Association (NBA)

Nakase grew up in Orange County, California, where she was honored as the county's high school player of the year. She played college basketball for the UCLA Bruins, receiving honorable mention as an all-conference player in the Pacific-10.  A third-generation Japanese-American, she became the first Asian American to play in the National Women's Basketball League (NWBL). She also played in Germany before suffering a knee injury and retiring as a player. Nakase went into coaching, and served as a head coach of a women's team in Germany before becoming the first female head coach in Japan's top pro men's league. Nakase returned to the United States, joining the Clippers of the NBA as a video intern in 2012. She became an assistant coach to their NBA G League development team, Agua Caliente, in 2017. She became an NBA assistant for the Clippers in 2018, and joined the WNBA's Aces in 2022, when she became the first Asian American coach to win an WNBA title.

Early life
Nakase was born in Anaheim, California, the youngest of three daughters to Gary and Debra Nakase. Her parents are both second-generation Japanese-Americans.

Nakase grew up in Huntington Beach, California, where she attended Marina High School and was a four-year lettererman playing basketball. She led the school to two Sunset League titles.  In 1998, the team won their first California Interscholastic Federation (CIF) Southern Section title. Nakase averaged 13.9 points and 8.6 assists that season, when she was named the 1998 Orange County Player of the Year by both the Los Angeles Times and the Orange County Register. She finished her career as the Sunset League leader in career assists, and set school records for career assists, steals and three-point field goals made.

College career
She turned down a full scholarship from the University of California, Irvine to attend her dream school, the University of California, Los Angeles (UCLA), where she was a walk-on for the UCLA Bruins basketball team. Nakase redshirted as a freshman after injuring her left knee in an August summer league game, which required reconstructive surgery to repair her anterior cruciate ligament (ACL). She recovered to become a three-year starter at point guard for UCLA, averaging 4.9 points and 3.7 assists per game in her career. In 2002, she earned honorable mention as an all-conference player in the Pacific-10 after averaging a career-high 7.9 points and 5.1 assists per game.

Professional career
Nakase played in the NWBL for two seasons, playing with the San Jose Spiders in 2005 and the San Diego Siege in 2006. She was the league's first Asian-American player. In 2007, she tried out with the Phoenix Mercury of the WNBA, but was waived. She coached an Amateur Athletic Union (AAU) team, and went to Germany to play one season with Herner in 2007–08, when she again tore knee ligaments. 

Opting to retire as a player rather than undergoing surgery again, Nakase coached for the Wolfenbüttel Wildcats in the Damen-Basketball-Bundesliga for the 2008–09 and 2009–10 seasons. She next went to Japan in hopes of playing, but learned that the Japanese women's league doesn't allow foreign players. A friend of Nakase's, Darin Maki, was playing with the Tokyo Apache, and arranged with his coach, former NBA coach Bob Hill, to allow Nakase to observe practice before the 2010–11 season began. She then prepared a scouting report for the team's next opponent, which led to a volunteer assistant coaching position under Hill. After the Apache folded at the end of the season, Saitama Broncos head coach Dean Murray hired Nakase as an assistant at the urging of Hill. She took over the struggling team midseason after Murray stepped down, and became the first female head coach in the bj league, Japan's top professional men's league. However, her father persuaded her to not return to Japan in order to pursue her dream of becoming a coach in the NBA.

In September 2012, Nakase began a yearlong internship in the NBA with the Los Angeles Clippers, working under the team's video coordinator. She became the team's assistant video coordinator. She was one of 15 women of Asian or Pacific Islander heritage honored at the White House in 2013 as their Champions of Change. During the two-week 2014 NBA Summer League in Las Vegas, Nakase was an assistant coach for the Clippers, becoming the first woman to sit on the bench as an NBA assistant.

In 2017–18, Nakase was an assistant coach for the Clippers' NBA G League affiliate, Agua Caliente Clippers, under head coach Casey Hill—the son of her mentor, Bob Hill. In 2018–19, she was promoted to be a player development assistant coach for the L.A. Clippers, becoming one of the few female coaches in the NBA. In 2020–21, Tyronn Lue replaced the departed Rivers as the Los Angeles coach, and Nakase became an assistant again for Agua Caliente under their new coach, Paul Hewitt. In 2022, she was a finalist for the head coach position of the WNBA's Phoenix Mercury.

On February 25, 2022, Nasake joined the WNBA as an assistant to the Las Vegas Aces's new head coach, Becky Hammon. She and Hammon, who was a long-time San Antonio Spurs assistant coach, had been the NBA's two longest-tenured women coaches. On September 20, 2022, Nakase became the first Asian American coach to win an WNBA title.

Head coaching record

|- 
| style="text-align:left;"|Saitama Broncos
| style="text-align:left;"|2011-12
| 41||12||29|||| style="text-align:center;"|10th in Eastern|||-||-||-||
| style="text-align:center;"|-
|-

See also 
 List of coaches of Asian heritage in sports leagues in the United States and Canada
 List of female NBA coaches

Notes

References

External links
UCLA bio at UCLABruins.com

1980 births
Living people
Agua Caliente Clippers coaches
American expatriate basketball people in Germany
American expatriate basketball people in Japan
American men's basketball coaches
American sportspeople of Japanese descent
American women's basketball coaches
American women's basketball players
Basketball coaches from California
Basketball players from Anaheim, California
Los Angeles Clippers personnel
Point guards
Saitama Broncos coaches
Sportspeople from Huntington Beach, California
UCLA Bruins women's basketball players